eBioMedicine is a peer-reviewed open access medical journal initially launched by Elsevier, shortly thereafter supported by Cell Press and The Lancet, and in 2018 incorporated in The Lancet family journals, at the occasion of the inception of its sister journal eClinicalMedicine (Impact Factor 17.033), also published by The Lancet.
In January 2022 eBioMedicine and eClinicalMedicine became parts of THE LANCET Discovery Science, a suite of open access journals dedicated to essential early evidence. https://www.thelancet.com/discovery-science

The journal is abstracted and indexed in Index Medicus/MEDLINE/PubMed.

References

External links

General medical journals
Elsevier academic journals
Publications established in 2014